The 1948 All-Big Nine Conference football team consists of American football players selected to the All-Big Nine Conference teams selected by the Associated Press (AP), United Press (UP) and the International News Service (INS) for the 1948 Big Nine Conference football season. Players selected as first-team honorees by the AP, UP and INS are displayed in bold.

Michigan compiled a 9–0 record, won both the Big Nine Conference and national football championships, and had four players who were selected as consensus first-team All-Big Nine players.  Michigan's consensus first-team honorees were quarterback Pete Elliott, end Dick Rifenburg, tackle Alvin Wistert, guard Dominic Tomasi.

Other players receiving first-team honors from at least two of the three major selectors were Indiana halfback George Taliaferro, Purdue halfback Harry Szulborski, Northwestern fullback Art Murakowski, Minnesota end Bud Grant, Minnesota guard Leo Nomellini, and Northwestern center Alex Sarkisian.

All Big-Ten selections

Ends
 Dick Rifenburg, Michigan (AP-1, INS-1; UP-1)
 Bud Grant, Minnesota (AP-1, INS-1; UP-1)
 Bob McKenzie, Iowa (AP-2, UP-2)
 Walt Kersulis, Illinois (AP-2, UP-2)
 Charles Hagmann, Northwestern (INS-2)
 Tony Klimek, Illinois (INS-2)

Tackles
 Alvin Wistert, Michigan (AP-1, INS-1; UP-1)
 Bill Kay, Iowa (AP-1, INS-2; UP-1)
 Phil O'Reilly, Purdue (AP-2, INS-1, UP-2)
 John Goldsberry, Indiana (AP-2, UP-2)
 William S. "Steve" Sawle, Northwestern (INS-2)

Guards
 Dominic Tomasi, Michigan (AP-1, INS-1; UP-1)
 Leo Nomellini, Minnesota (AP-1, INS-1; UP-1)
 Dave Templeton, Ohio State (AP-2, INS-2, UP-2)
 Herb Siegert, Illinois (AP-2, INS-2, UP-2)

Centers
 Alex Sarkisian, Northwestern (AP-1, INS-1; UP-1)
 Clayton Tonnemaker, Minnesota (AP-2, UP-2)
 Bob Wilson, Wisconsin (INS-2)

Quarterbacks
 Pete Elliott, Michigan (AP-1, INS-1; UP-1)
 Don Burson, Northwestern (AP-2, UP-2)

Halfbacks
 Harry Szulborski, Purdue (AP-1, INS-1; UP-1)
 George Taliaferro, Indiana (AP-1, INS-1; UP-1)
 Frank Aschenbrenner, Northwestern (AP-2, INS-2, UP-2)
 Chuck Ortmann, Michigan (AP-2, INS-2, UP-2)
 Everett Faunce, Minnesota (INS-2)
 Al DiMarco, Iowa (INS-2)
 Dwight Eddleman, Illinois (INS-2)

Fullbacks
 Art Murakowski, Northwestern (AP-1, INS-1; UP-1)
 Joe Whisler, Ohio State (AP-2, INS-1, UP-2)

Key
AP = Associated Press, chosen by conference coaches

UP = United Press

INS = International News Service

Bold = Consensus first-team selection by the AP, UP and INS

See also
1948 College Football All-America Team

References

All-Big Nine Conference
All-Big Ten Conference football teams